MotoMagx was a Linux kernel-based mobile operating system developed and launched in 2007 by Motorola to run on their mid-to-high-end mobile phones. The system was based on MontaVista's Mobilinux. Originally intended for 60% of their upcoming devices, it was soon dropped in favor of Android and Windows Mobile operating systems.

MOTOMAGX was only compatible with Motorola's GSM/UMTS devices (as shown below). This was due to the lack of an implementation compatible with Qualcomm CDMA2000 devices. As a result, Motorola often sold multiple device variants with radically different firmware. For example, the Motorola RAZR2 on T-Mobile shipped with MOTOMAGX, whereas the RAZR2 on Verizon Wireless shipped with Motorola's P2k firmware.

This created significant confusion for customers, as the user experience varied widely between two otherwise identical devices, simply based on which carrier they were on.

Devices
Phones based on this OS are:

Motorola EM30
Motorola ROKR E2
Motorola ROKR E8
Motorola ROKR/RIZR Z6
Motorola U9
Motorola RAZR2 V8
Motorola VE66
Motorola ZINE ZN5
Motorola Tundra V76r
Motorola ROKR EM35
Motorola ROKR ZN200

References

 Introducing MOTOMAGX
 MOTODEV > Technologies > MOTOMAGX

Embedded Linux distributions
Mobile operating systems
Linux distributions